Calboni M'Bani better known by his stage name Calbo is a French rapper. He was a member of the French rap duo Ärsenik with his brother Gaëlino M'Bani known as Lino in the duo. He has also his solo output independent of Ärsenik. Calbo's family originates from Congo.

Ärsenik started as a band in mid 1990s. Until 1997, the group also included Tony Truand, a cousin. In 1998, now a duo, Ärsenik released their first album Quelques gouttes suffisent went double gold. In 2007 the group released a disc titled S'il en reste quelque chose which included the most popular songs from the two brothers, such as "L'enfer remonte à la surface", "Rime & chatiments" and "Sexe, pouvoir & biftons".

In the late 1990s, Calbo and his brother Lino teamed up with a group of rappers who were also second-generation Africans, on a collaborative project called Bisso Na Bisso, an expression which means "just between ourselves" in Lingala, the most commonly spoken language in the Congo region. Part of this group were Ben-J (from Les Neg'Marrons), Passi (from Ministère A.M.E.R.),  twin brothers Doc and G Kill (from 2Bal), and Mystik and his female cousin M'Passi. The group embarked on a collective return to their African roots, featuring music with an innovative fusion of styles, that mixed modern hip-hop and zouk sounds with traditional Congolese rumba.

Calbo has also continued with a solo music career. In 2003, he charted in a hit "Trop de peine" by Lynnsha featuring Calbo vocals.

In 2012, he released his solo album titled 6ème Chaudron and in June 2013, he released his solo single "C'est là-bas" on Trèfle record label accompanied by a music video. It featured another fellow Congolese artist known as VR.

Discography

Albums
in duo Ärsenik
See discography of Ärsenik

Solo

Singles
in duo Ärsenik
See discography of Ärsenik

Collaborative singles

Collaborative singles

References

French rappers
French people of Republic of the Congo descent
Living people
Year of birth missing (living people)